The Primera División de Fútbol Profesional Apertura 2000 season (officially "Torneo Apertura 2000") started on August 26, 2000, and finished on December 30, 2000.

The season saw C.D. Águila win its 12th league title after a 3–2 victory over C.D. Municipal Limeno in the final.

Team information

Personnel and sponsoring

Managerial changes

During the season

League standings

Semifinals 1st Leg

Semifinals 2nd Leg

Final

List of foreign players in the league
This is a list of foreign players in Apertura 2000. The following players:
have played at least one apetura game for the respective club.
have not been capped for the El Salvador national football team on any level, independently from the birthplace

ADET
  Alexis Obregon

C.D. Águila
  Adrian Mahia
  Fulgencio Deonel Bordón 
  Marcio Sampaio

Alianza F.C.
  Horacio Lugo
  Alejandro Curbelo

Atletico Balboa
  Franklin Webster
  Ernesto Aquino
  Enrique Reneau
  Hugo Sarmiento

Atletico Marte
  Oscar Mejía
  Emiliano Pedrozo

 (player released mid season)
  (player Injured mid season)
 Injury replacement player

Dragon
  Saul Ye

C.D. FAS
  Alejandro Bentos 
  Antonio Serrano
  Claudio Pasadi
  Pablo Quiñonez
  Alejandro Soler 
  Ricardo Correia

C.D. Luis Ángel Firpo
   Mauricio Dos Santos
  Ever Da Silva
   Raúl Toro
  Washington Hernández

Municipal Limeno
   Carlos Villarreal
  Jahir Camero
   César Charum

Santa Clara
  TBD

Top scorers

External links

Primera División de Fútbol Profesional Apertura seasons
El
1